Józef Stanisław Tischner (12 March 1931 – 28 June 2000) was a Polish priest and philosopher. The first chaplain of the trade union, "Solidarity" (Polish Solidarność).

Life 

Tischner was born in Stary Sącz to a Góral family and grew up in the village Łopuszna in the south east of Poland. He studied at Jagiellonian University in Kraków. In the 1970s he became an important writer of the opposition movement against the socialist government of the People's Republic of Poland. In 1980s he was considered the semi-official chaplain of the Solidarity movement, and was praised by Pope John Paul II.

After the fall of communism in 1989, he continued preaching the importance of ethics in the new capitalist Poland. In September 1999, Tischner received the Order of the White Eagle, Poland's highest decoration.

Tischner remains a controversial figure in Poland. He frequently criticized Polish religiousness by calling it as flat (shallow) as a pancake, he also accused the Polish clergy of being extremely conservative, engaged in politics and antisemitism.

Fellow of Collegium Invisibile as a professor of philosophy. He died in Kraków on 28 June 2000.

Selected publications 

Tischner wrote and published more than 600 articles and books.

His two main works, in which he explained his original philosophical concepts, are: 
The Philosophy of Drama (Filozofia dramatu) (1998) 
The Controversy over Human Existence (Spór o istnienie człowieka) (1998)

Most notable among his Góral themed works is:
A Goral History of Philosophy (Historia filozofii po góralsku) (1997)

See also
 Knights of the Order of the White Eagle

Sources 
 "Nie ma rzeczy niemożliwych" . Magazyn Kulturalny Tygodnika Powszechnego nr 7/8 (56/57), 08 lipca 2001. 
 "Lektury nie tylko obowiązkowe". Dziennik Polski, 14 maja 2009.

References

External links 
 

1931 births
2000 deaths
People from Stary Sącz
Polish Gorals
20th-century Polish Roman Catholic priests
Catholic philosophers
Roman Catholic writers
Jagiellonian University alumni
Fellows of Collegium Invisibile
20th-century Polish philosophers